Guagua National Colleges often called GNC is a private, non-sectarian Catholic school in Guagua, Pampanga, Philippines. It offers primary, secondary, and tertiary education. Guagua National Colleges founded by Fr. Nicanor M. Banzali, former parish priest of Guagua, Pampanga.

History
The Early Years

In 1918 Fr. Banzali conceived the idea of founding a Catholic educational institution. Then, only one elementary school existed in each town. Accordingly, with the encouragement and approval of Michael O'Doherty, Archbishop of Manila and the generous cooperation and support of handful of civic-spirited residents of the town, the Guagua National Institute started to operate on June 18, 1918, with the opening of classes in the primary grades. Classes were held at the old Guagua Catholic Convent.

Before the school year 1918–1919 came to a close, the Secretary of Public Instruction, Charles E. Yeater, authorized the school to offer the complete elementary course with an average size of 35 pupils in each grade. Mrs. Feliza D. Goseco was installed as its first Elementary School Principal.

During the school year 1919–1920, the high school department was opened with 32 students enrolled in the first year. The following year, there were 16 students enrolled in the second year. In 1922, the third year class had four students and, as expected, the opening of the fourth year class was deferred for the following year because only three students actually enrolled. In 1924, the fourth year class was opened with nine students.

The Guagua National Institute was granted government recognition by the E. A. Gilmore, the Secretary of Public Education, on March 17, 1925 to offer complete secondary course.

In 1932, following the transfer of Father Banzali to a new parish in Arayat, the school moved from the premises of the Guagua Catholic church to a temporary site, a residential house in barrio San Roque. However, due to the inadequacies of the place to meet the rigid requirements for schools, the Guagua National Institute had to be transferred to a bigger site in front of the national road in San Nicolas. On February 16, 1942, the three buildings were razed to the ground by a fire that enveloped important sections of the town of Guagua. A steady increase in its enrolment, both in the elementary and in the high school department, made it imperative to build two additional buildings. Between 1942 and 1946, classes were interrupted by World War II.

During the school year 1939–1940, it gained government permission to offer first year subjects in Junior Normal and Associate in Arts. During the school year 1941–1942, the Guagua National Institute had a total enrolment of 1,500 student from elementary, secondary and first year collegiate department

On January 1, 1946, the Guagua National Institute was able to buy its present site in barrio Sta. Filomena and started putting up buildings.

Facilities
The multi-storey concrete buildings include teaching, sports and recreational facilities that house 122 classrooms, 9 Science laboratories, 2 Industrial Arts Shops, 3 Guidance Offices and Administrative Offices. Other facilities are:

  Puno HALL, also known as the Information Technology Training Center
  LIMLINGAN HALL, a 5-storey edifice that accommodates 30 classrooms
 ADMINISTRATION BLDG., Houses BOT Conference Room, Office of the President, and Office of the Corporate Secretary
 BANZALI HALL, Accommodates 27 classrooms
 GOSECO HALL, A 4-storey structure that houses 68 rooms
 DON MONICO MERCADO MAIN STAGE also known as Alpha-Beta Triplex, provides venue for Mass celebrations and cultural presentations.
  GOZO HALL, also known as Multi-Media Center.
 TANJANGCO HALL, a gymnasium with an indoor basketball/volleyball court that can accommodate 3000 persons on the bleachers.
  MOTHER OF PERPETUAL HELP CHAPEL has a seating capacity of 300. 
  ADORATION ROOM annexed to the main chapel houses the tabernacle with the Blessed Sacrament.
  MAIN LIBRARY opens daily from 8:00 – 7:00 pm. It adopts an open-shelves system.
  CAPTAIN RUBEN SONGCO BULWAGANG ALUMNI
  AUDIO-VISUAL CENTER
  SPEECH LABORATORIES
  GRADUATE SCHOOL SEMINAR ROOMS
  CISCO NETWORKING LABORATORY
  HRM MINI-HOTEL
  SPACIOUS COVERED GYM

Montessori
Guagua National Colleges also offers Montessori education for elementary and high school levels.

The G.N.C. High School Montessori Program makes use of the Dynamic Learning Process (DLP) aimed at improving academic performance of the students.

External links
 Guagua National Colleges Academic Programs
 
 
 Facebook

Educational institutions established in 1918
Catholic universities and colleges in the Philippines
Universities and colleges in Pampanga
1918 establishments in the Philippines